Aïn Bénian may refer to:

 Aïn Bénian, Aïn Defla, a municipality or commune in Aïn Defla province, Algeria
 Aïn Bénian, Algiers, a municipality or commune in Algiers province, Algeria